Mauve is a pale purple color named after the mallow flower (French: mauve). The first use of the word mauve as a color was in 1796–98 according to the Oxford English Dictionary, but its use seems to have been rare before 1859. Another name for the color is mallow, with the first recorded use of mallow as a color name in English in 1611.

Mauve contains more gray and more blue than a pale tint of magenta. Many pale wildflowers called "blue" are more accurately classified as mauve.  Mauve is also sometimes described as pale violet.

Mauveine, the first commercial aniline dye

The synthetic dye mauve was first so named in 1859. Chemist William Henry Perkin, then eighteen, was attempting in 1856 to synthesize quinine, which was used to treat malaria. He noticed an unexpected residue, which turned out to be the first aniline dye. Perkin originally named the dye Tyrian purple after the historical dye, but the product was renamed mauve after it was marketed in 1859. It is now usually called Perkin's mauve, mauveine, or aniline purple.

Earlier references to a mauve dye in 1856–1858 referred to a color produced using the semi-synthetic dye murexide or a mixture of natural dyes. Perkin was so successful in marketing his discovery to the dye industry that his biography by Simon Garfield is simply entitled Mauve. Between 1859 and 1861, mauve became a fashion must have. The weekly journal All the Year Round described women wearing the colour as "all flying countryward, like so many migrating birds of purple paradise". Punch magazine published cartoons poking fun at the huge popularity of the colour: “The Mauve Measles are spreading to so serious an extent that it is high time to consider by what means [they] may be checked.”

But, because it faded easily, the success of mauve dye was short-lived, and by 1873 it was replaced by other synthetic dyes. As the memory of the original dye soon receded, the contemporary understanding of mauve is as a lighter, less-saturated color than it was originally known.

The 1890s are sometimes referred to in retrospect as the "Mauve Decade" because of the popularity of the subtle color among progressive artistic types, both in Europe and the US.

Variations

Rich mauve

The color displayed at right is the rich tone of mauve called mauve by 
Crayola.

French mauve (deep mauve)

The color displayed at right is the deep tone of mauve that is called mauve by
Pourpre.com, a color list widely popular in France.

Opera mauve

The color displayed at right is opera mauve.

The first recorded use of opera mauve as a color name in English was in 1927.

Mauve taupe

The color displayed at right is mauve taupe.

The first recorded use of mauve taupe as a color name in English was in 1925.

Old mauve

The color displayed at right is old mauve.

The first recorded use of old mauve as a color name in English was in 1925.

The normalized color coordinates for old mauve are identical to wine dregs, which was first recorded as a color name in English in 1924.

See also
 Shades of purple
 Lilac (color)
 Malvaria (Pyroluria), from the term mauve factor in Orthomolecular psychiatry

References

External links 
 

 

Shades of pink
Shades of violet